Gamma-Dynacare Medical Laboratories is a Canadian medical laboratory services company based in Brampton, Ontario, Canada. Dynacare operates laboratories in Brampton, Bowmanville, London, Ottawa, Thunder Bay, Pointe-Claire, Laval, and Winnipeg. In addition to the main laboratories Dynacare operates patient services centers throughout Ontario, Quebec, Manitoba, Saskatchewan and Alberta, British Columbia.

Dynacare is an operational partnership founded in 1997 as Gamma-Dynacare between: Dynacare Laboratories; Gamma North Peel Partnership Inc.; and Bio-Science Laboratory (Ontario) Limited. In 2002 Dynacare Laboratories (one of the Dynacare partners) was acquired by LabCorp for $480-million (U.S.) while also assuming Dynacare debt worth $205-million.  In 2015, it rebranded itself back to Dynacare.

In 2011 Dynacare acquired the medical laboratory division of Warnex Inc. (TSX:WNX) for $7.5 Million.

Awards

2013
 GTA Top 95 Employers

2012
 GTA Top Employer

2011
 GTA Top Employer

2010
 Top 100 Employer in Canada 
 GTA Top Employer

2009
 Top 100 Employer in Canada 
 Top 75 Employer in Toronto

2003
Company of the Year by the Greater Ottawa Chamber of Commerce

2002
Outstanding Business Achievement Award by the City of Brampton and the Brampton Board of Trade

References

External links 
 Company web site: dynacare.ca
 E-Zlab Health Service offers a remote blood test service for the greater Montreal area and for which analysis are done through gamma-dynacare.com

Companies based in Brampton
Laboratories in Canada
Commercial laboratories
Health care companies of Canada
Canadian brands